Aldo Stella (born August 9, 1930) was an Italian football goalkeeper who played in Egypt for Al-Masry and Zamalek.

Personal life
Aldo is the younger cousin of Ettore Moscatelli.

Honors
Zamalek SC
Egyptian Premier League: (1)
 1959–60
Egypt Cup: (4)
 1957–58, 1958–59, 1959–60, 1961–62

References

Al Masry SC players
Zamalek SC players
1930 births
Living people
Sportspeople from Port Said
Egyptian Premier League players
Association football goalkeepers
Italian footballers
Italian expatriate footballers
Expatriate footballers in Egypt